Delia platura, the seedcorn maggot or the bean seed fly, is a fly species in the family Anthomyiidae.

D. platura is an agricultural pest of peas and beans. It is a vector of bacteria that cause potato blackleg. It can be controlled by mouldboard ploughing.

See also
Agriculture in the United Kingdom

References

External links
 
 

Anthomyiidae
Insects described in 1826
Agricultural pest insects
Pulse crop diseases
Diptera of Europe